Grevillea longicuspis is a species of flowering plant in the family Proteaceae and is endemic to a small area of the Northern Territory in Australia. It is a shrub with divided leaves that are egg-shaped in outline with sharply-pointed teeth or lobes, and clusters of red flowers with a red or creamy pink style.

Description

Distribution and habitat
This grevillea grows in open woodland in sandy soil, and is restricted to a small area near Darwin in the Northern Territory.

Conservation status
Grevillea longicuspis is listed as "near threatened" under the Northern Territory Government Territory Parks and Wildlife Act.

References

longicuspis
Proteales of Australia
Taxa named by Donald McGillivray
Flora of the Northern Territory
Plants described in 1986